To the Death is a 1917 American silent drama film directed by Burton L. King and released by Metro Pictures. The film is considered to be lost.

Plot
As described in a film magazine, Bianca (Petrova) models in clay and makes laces for a living. She accepts an opportunity to go to Paris and receive an art education, promising to send for her sister Rosa (Brent) and mother. A secret service agent betrays Rosa, and Bianca hurries home. Upon the death of Rosa she swears vengeance. She promises to marry Lavinne (Standing), the secret service agent, if he will disclose Rosa's betrayer, and is horrified when Lavinne shows her the picture of Etienne (Hamilton), the man she loves. Etienne comes to her room and she plunges a dagger into his breast. Lavinne forces her to accompany him to a hotel room where he scornfully tells her that he won her by trickery, and of having used Etienne's assumed name to lure Rosa away from home. Lavinne's valet (Korlin) informs the police that Lavinne is a traitor to his country and he is arrested. Bianca returns to her studio where she finds Etienne recovering from his wound, and they face a future of happiness.

Cast 
 Olga Petrova as Bianca Sylva (credited as Mme. Olga Petrova)
 Mahlon Hamilton as Etienne Du Inette
 Wyndham Standing as Jules Lavinne
 Henry Leone as Antonio Manatelli
 Evelyn Brent as Rosa
 Violet Reed as The Woman of Mystery
 Marion Singer as Maria
 Boris Korlin as Valet

Reception
Like many American films of the time, To the Death was subject to cuts by city and state film censorship boards. The Chicago Board of Censors cut two scenes of the woman with a dagger taking an oath of vengeance at an altar.

See also
List of lost films

References

External links

1917 films
1917 drama films
Silent American drama films
American silent feature films
American black-and-white films
Films directed by Burton L. King
Lost American films
Films with screenplays by Lillian Case Russell
1917 lost films
Lost drama films
Metro Pictures films
1910s American films